The AUT.18 was a prototype fighter aircraft developed in Italy by Aeronautica Umbra shortly before the outbreak of World War II. It was designed in 1934 by Felice Trojani, who at that time was collaborating with Umberto Nobile on the Arctic flights of the airships Norge and Italia. The aircraft's designation came from initials of the manufacturer, the surname of the designer, and the aircraft's wing area (18 m²), the sole prototype receiving the serial no. M.M.363.

Design & Development
Born from the same Regia Aeronautica requirement that spawned the Caproni-Vizzola F.5, FIAT G.50, Macchi C.200, Meridionali Ro 51 and Reggiane Re 2000 fighters, the A.U.T.18 flew for the first time on 22 April 1939, powered by a  Fiat A.80 R.C.41 radial engine. The fighter had an all-metal stressed-skin structure, covered in duralumin, featuring an inwardly-retracting undercarriage and retractable tail-wheel and was armed with two  Breda-SAFAT machine-guns mounted in the wings just outboard of the undercarriage.

Flight trials proved disappointing and lagged behind the other fighters in Progetto R - the modernisation (riammodernamento) of the Regia Aeronautica. With no production orders forthcoming, despite the prototype being returned to the Umbra factory at Foligno for modifications on 20 February 1940 and a second flight test series from 5 November 1940, no improvement was demonstrated over fighters already in production so the A.U.T.18 was abandoned.

Operational history
After delivery to the Regia Aeronautica on 5 November 1940 the fate of the prototype is not known, possibly being transferred to Germany for evaluation, it was also rumoured to have been captured by British forces, but it is more likely that it was destroyed in a raid after its transfer to Orvieto.

Specifications (AUT.18)

See also

Further reading
Taylor, J. H. (ed) (1989) Jane's Encyclopedia of Aviation. Studio Editions: London. p. 30
F. Trojani, La coda di Minosse, Mursia, Milano, 1964
Lanfranco Cesari, AUSA - Una fabbrica una storia, Pro Foligno, Foligno, 2004
R. Gentilli L'aviazione da caccia italiana 1918-1939. Volume 2o: tecnica, stemmi, esportazioni, Ed.A.I. s.r.l., Firenze, 1982

Single-engined tractor aircraft
1930s Italian fighter aircraft
Aeronautica Umbra aircraft
Low-wing aircraft